The Billboard Hot 100 is a chart that ranks the best-performing singles of the United States. Its data, published by Billboard magazine and compiled by Nielsen SoundScan, is based collectively on each single's weekly physical and digital sales, as well as airplay and streaming. At the end of a year, Billboard will publish an annual list of the 100 most successful songs throughout that year on the Hot 100 chart based on the information. For 2015, the list was published on December 9, calculated with data from December 6, 2014 to November 28, 2015.
The funk track "Uptown Funk" by British producer Mark Ronson, featuring American singer Bruno Mars, who co-wrote and voiced the lyrics was named the number 1 song of 2015, despite being released in late 2014. It spent the longest time at number 1 for the year, 14 weeks, and spent the entire year in the Top 40 region. This is also the joint-fifth longest time at number 1 for a single in the history of the Hot 100 post-1958 inception, after Lil Nas X and Billy Ray Cyrus's "Old Town Road" (19 weeks), Mariah Carey and Boyz II Men's "One Sweet Day" and Luis Fonsi, Daddy Yankee and Justin Bieber's "Despacito" (16 weeks), and Harry Styles' "As It Was" (15 weeks).

List

See also
 2015 in American music
 List of Billboard Hot 100 number-one singles of 2015
 List of Billboard Hot 100 top-ten singles in 2015

References

United States Hot 100 Year-End
Billboard charts